The 46th Annual AWGIE Awards, which is conducted by the Australian Writers' Guild, honors the best in Australian writing for screen, television, stage and radio. It was held at the Plaza Ballroom in Melbourne, Victoria, Australia on 4 October 2013, and was hosted by comedian Sammy J. David Williamson AO and Attorney General George Brandis were also in attendance.

Winners are highlighted in bold

Nominees

Telemovie: Adaptation
An Accidental Soldier - Blake Ayshford
Underground: The Julian Assange Story - Robert Connolly

Television: Mini-Series Original
Devil's Dust - Kris Mrska
Underbelly: Badness - Nicola Aken, Peter Gawler, Felicity Packard, Jeffrey Truman
Underbelly: Squizzy - Peter Gawler, Andrew Muir, Felicity Packard, Jeffrey Truman

Television: Series
Rake (R v Greene) - Peter Duncan
Rake (R v Mohammed) - Peter Duncan
Rake (R v Floyd) - Andrew Knight
Redfern Now (Raymond) - Adrian Wills

Television: Serial
Home and Away (5660) - Sam Atwell
Home and Away (5616) - Louise Bowes
Home and Away (5714) - Gary Sewell

Comedy: Sketch Or Light Entertainment
Good News Week (The Second Going) - Mat Blackwell, George Dodd, Simon Dodd, Warwick Holt, Paul Livingston, Ian Simmons
How Green was my Cactus - Doug Edwards, Lindy Wilson, Shane Edwards

Comedy: Narrative
A Moody Christmas (Decapod Crustaceans) - Phil Lloyd, Trent O'Donnell 
A Moody Christmas (Separate Seats) - Phil Lloyd, Trent O'Donnell
Please Like Me (Portuguese Custard Tarts) - Josh Thomas, Liz Doran, Thomas Ward
Please Like Me (Spanish Eggs) - Josh Thomas, Liz Doran, Thomas Ward

Feature Film: Screenplay Original
Felony - Joel Edgerton
Drift - Morgan O'Neill
The Rocket - Kim Mordaunt

Feature Film: Screenplay Adaptation
A Most Wanted Man - Andrew Bovell
Lore - Cate Shortland, Robert Mukherjee

Radio: Original
See How The Leaf People Run - Michele Lee
Eaten - Gina Schien

Radio: Adaptation
Cross Sections - Suzie Miller
Head Full Of Love - Alana Valentine

Interactive Media
The Opera House Project - Sam Doust

Animation
The Adventures of Figaro Pho: The Fear Of Unfamiliar Toilets - Bruce Griffiths
A Cautionary Tail - Erica Harrison
Ghosts of Time: Mummy Mia - David Witt

Documentary: Public Broadcast
Whitlam: The Power & The Passion - Paul Clarke
Love & Fury: Judith Wright & 'Nugget' Coombs - John Hughes, Penelope Chai
Red Obsession - David Roach, Warwick Ross

Documentary: Corporate & Trading
Your Choice - Ken Wallace

Theatre For Young Audiences
Tame - Declan Greene
Truck Stop - Lachlan Philpott
Driving into Walls - Suzie Miller
The Warrior And the Princess - Shirley Van Sanden

Theatre: Community & Youth Theatre
The Quiet Brother - Ivy Mak
Beagle Bay Chronicles - Casey Nicholls
Grounded - Alana Valentine

Theatre: Stage
Medea - Kate Mulvany and Anne-Louise Sarks
Pompeii, L.A. - Declan Greene
Happy Ending - Melissa Reeves
Sweetest Things - Kate Rice

Theatre: Children's
Starchaser - Lally Katz
The House that Jack Filled - Finegan Kruckemeyer

Short Film
Spine - Sophie Miller
The Amber Amulet - Genevieve Hegney and Matthew Moore
Bursting! - Gary Sewell
The Last Time I Saw Richard - Nicholas Verso

Children's Television: P Classification
Guess How Much I Love You (I Promise) - David Evans
Guess How Much I Love You (A Hare's Tale) - Lisa Hoppe
Guess How Much I Love You (The Big Apple) - Jane Schneider

Children's Television: C Classification
Ghosts Of Time (Alien Adventure) - David Evans
Dance Academy (New Rules) - Josh Mapleston
Dance Academy (Not For Nothing) - Samantha Strauss
Dance Academy (A Perfect Storm) - Samantha Strauss

Monte Miller Award: Long Form
Fury - Charlotte McConaghy
Starfish - Hannah Moon, Robin Geradts-Gill and Stephen Sholl
The Knot - Jessica Paine

Monte Miller Award: Short Form
Trunk - Derek Foster
Drive By - Edward Lyons
Any Given Day - Anne O'Hoy and Leah Pullen

David Williamson Prize
Alana Valentine

Dorothy Crawford Prize
For outstanding contribution to the profession
Neil Armfield

Richard Lane Award
For outstanding service and dedication to the Australian Writers' Guild
Simon Hopkinson

Hector Crawford Award
For outstanding contribution to the craft via a body of script editing work
Kym Goldsworthy

Fred Parsons Award
For outstanding contribution to Australian Comedy
Guy Rundle

External links
Australian Writers' Guild Official Website
2013 Annual AWGIE Award Winners

References

2013 film awards
2013 in Australian television
AWGIE Awards